Saint Eutropius of Saintes is venerated as the first bishop of Saintes, France.  According to tradition, he was a Roman or a Persian of royal descent who was sent to evangelize Gaul either by Saint Clement in the 1st century or by Pope Fabian in the 250s as a companion of Saint Denis.

He lived as a hermit near Saintes and converted to Christianity the governor's daughter, Saint Eustella or Eustelle.  According to tradition, the governor was so enraged by his daughter's conversion that he had both her and Eutropius killed.  Eutropius was killed by having his head split open with an axe.

Gregory of Tours mentions the tradition of Eutropius’ martyrdom in his work, but also notes that before Bishop Palladius of Saintes translated Eutropius’ relics around 590 to the Romanesque church of St. Eutropius in Saintes, no one really knew the legend of Eutropius.  In the 6th century, the poet Venantius Fortunatus refers to Eutropius in connection with Saintes.

References 

Bishops of Saintes
3rd-century bishops in Gaul
French hermits
Ante-Nicene Christian martyrs
Gallo-Roman saints
1st-century Gallo-Roman people